3rd parallel may refer to:

3rd parallel north, a circle of latitude in the Northern Hemisphere
3rd parallel south, a circle of latitude in the Southern Hemisphere